The 2021 J2 League, also known as the  for sponsorship reasons, was the 23rd season of J2 League, the top Japanese professional league for association football clubs, since its establishment in 1999. The league started on 27 February 2021 and ended on 5 December.

Clubs

With no relegations from J1 League, the second division hosted the same number of teams, since there were also no relegations to J3 League in 2020, but there were two promotions from the third division. This year, though, saw four relegations to J3 to match the four relegations from J1.

Tokushima Vortis left the second division after six seasons, coming back to J1, this time winning the title and topping the table in 2020. Despite losing in the last match against rivals and runners-up Avispa Fukuoka, both clubs assured themselves of the promotion to J1 with one game still to be played.

Meanwhile, in J3 League, two teams won promotion to J2: Blaublitz Akita stormed their way to J2, winning their second title in J3, but this time also getting promoted to J2 (unlike what happened in 2017, when they won, but did not hold a J2 license; this was their first appearance in the second tier since 1986). In the last match of the season, SC Sagamihara overcame Nagano Parceiro and clinched their first promotion ever, leaving the third division after seven seasons.

Personnel and kits

Managerial changes

Foreign players
As of 2021 season, there are no more restrictions on a number of signed foreign players, but clubs can only register up to five foreign players for a single match-day squad. Players from J.League partner nations (Thailand, Vietnam, Myanmar, Malaysia, Cambodia, Singapore, Indonesia and Qatar) are exempt from these restrictions.

Players name in bold indicates the player is registered during the mid-season transfer window.
Player's name in italics indicates the player has Japanese nationality in addition to their FIFA nationality, or is exempt from being treated as a foreign player due to having been born in Japan and being enrolled in, or having graduated from school in the country.

League table
Unlike last season, J. League has then decided to have four relegations to balance the number of teams in place for the 2022 season. While in 2020 no relegation was in place, 2021 saw four teams dropped to J3, re-establishing the number of teams in the third division to at least 17.

Season statistics

Top scorers
.

Hat-tricks

 4 Player scored 4 goals

See also

Japan Football Association (JFA)

League
Japanese association football league system
J.League
2021 J1 League (Tier 1)
2021 J2 League (Tier 2)
2021 J3 League (Tier 3)
2021 Japan Football League (JFL) (Tier 4)
2021 Regional Champions League (Promotion playoffs to JFL)
2021 Regional Leagues (Tier 5/6)

Cup(s)
2021 Fuji Xerox Super Cup (Super Cup)
2021 Emperor's Cup (National Open Cup)
2021 J.League YBC Levain Cup (League Cup)

References

External links
 Official website, JLeague.jp 

J2 League
2
Japan